Tony Emmott (born 1938) is an English bodybuilding champion, who won the 1977 Mr. Universe (professional) competition.

Biographical

Emmott was a postal deliverer, by occupation, prior to becoming a successful bodybuilder.

He owned his own gym, Olicana Health Studio, in Ilkley, Yorkshire, UK, which had a health food restaurant extension, added by Emmott. In 1979, well-known bodybuilding writer and photographer, Chris Lund, visited Emmott at his gym to conduct an interview about Emmott's training techniques, Emmott at the time being one of the country's top bodybuilders.

Emmott has appeared on the cover of a number of bodybuilding magazines including Health and Strength, Muscle Training Illustrated, Athletic Sport Journal, and Muscle World.

List of competitions

References

External links
 http://www.classicbodybuilders.com/classicbodybuilders4.html
 http://contest.bodybuilding.com/bio/923/
 http://bodybuilding_workout.home.insightbb.com/trainingarticles/tonyemmott/ 

1938 births
English bodybuilders
Living people
People associated with physical culture
People from Ilkley
Professional bodybuilders